The 2014 O'Reilly Auto Parts 300 was the sixth stock car race of the 2014 NASCAR Nationwide Series season, and the 18th iteration of the event. The race was held on Friday, April 4, 2014, in Fort Worth, Texas at Texas Motor Speedway, a  permanent tri-oval shaped racetrack. The race took the scheduled 200 laps to complete. In the closing laps of the race, JR Motorsports driver Chase Elliott would manage to pull away from the field to win his first career NASCAR Nationwide Series victory and his first of the season. To fill out the podium, Kyle Busch, driving for Joe Gibbs Racing, and Kyle Larson, driving for Turner Scott Motorsports, would finish second and third, respectively.

Background 
Texas Motor Speedway is a speedway located in the northernmost portion of the U.S. city of Fort Worth, Texas – the portion located in Denton County, Texas. The track measures 1.5 miles (2.4 km) around and is banked 24 degrees in the turns, and is of the oval design, where the front straightaway juts outward slightly. The track layout is similar to Atlanta Motor Speedway and Charlotte Motor Speedway (formerly Lowe's Motor Speedway). The track is owned by Speedway Motorsports, Inc., the same company that owns Atlanta and Charlotte Motor Speedway, as well as the short-track Bristol Motor Speedway.

Entry list 

 (R) denotes rookie driver.
 (i) denotes driver who is ineligible for series driver points.

Practice

First practice 
The first practice session was held on Thursday, April 3, at 5:00 PM CST. The session would last for one hour.

Final practice 
The final practice session, sometimes referred to as Happy Hour, was held on Thursday, April 3, at 6:30 PM CST. The session would last for one hour and 30 minutes.

Qualifying 
Qualifying was held on Friday, April 4, at 3:10 PM CST. Since Texas Motor Speedway is at least  in length, the qualifying system was a multi-car system that included three rounds. The first round was 25 minutes, where every driver would be able to set a lap within the 25 minutes. Then, the second round would consist of the fastest 24 cars in Round 1, and drivers would have 10 minutes to set a lap. Round 3 consisted of the fastest 12 drivers from Round 2, and the drivers would have 5 minutes to set a time. Whoever was fastest in Round 3 would win the pole.

Full qualifying results 

*Time not available.

Race results

Standings after the race 

Drivers' Championship standings

Note: Only the first 10 positions are included for the driver standings.

References 

2014 NASCAR Nationwide Series
NASCAR races at Texas Motor Speedway
April 2014 sports events in the United States
2014 in sports in Texas